Wootton Bassett was a parliamentary borough in Wiltshire, which elected two Members of Parliament (MPs) to the House of Commons from 1447 until 1832, when the rotten borough was abolished by the Great Reform Act.

History
The borough consisted of the town of Wootton Bassett, a market town in northern Wiltshire. Even when the borough was created by Henry VI it was a town of little consequence, with no significant industry or trade; by the 19th century it suffered from endemic unemployment, and the money to be gained by electoral corruption was probably one of its economic mainstays.

In 1831, the population of the borough was approximately 1,500, and contained 349 houses. The right to vote was exercised by all inhabitant householders paying scot and lot. At the last contested election, this amounted to 309 eligible voters, of whom 228 cast valid votes; in other words, only a comparatively small proportion of households were excluded from the franchise. The local landowners were generally recognised as "patrons" of the borough, and at most periods were able to exercise close control as they were the employers of the majority of the voters. However, they were occasionally vulnerable to the intervention of monied outsiders, since Wootton Bassett's voters had few scruples at selling their votes to the highest bidder.

At the end of the 17th century, the St John family of Lydiard Tregoze had the predominant influence in the borough, and could usually return their chosen candidates without difficulty, the main competing interest being that of the Hydes. After Henry St John, 1st Viscount Bolingbroke fled abroad in 1715 following the Jacobite Rebellion the St John influence was weakened, and a wealthy local landowner and clothier, Robert Neale of Corsham, was able to secure election in 1741. Neale then began to strengthen his interest, hoping to gain control of the second seat in alliance with the Hydes, and this led to a vigorous contest for control of the borough in the 1750s.

Corruption was playing its part in Wootton Bassett elections at least from the late 17th century. In 1690, a candidate who petitioned against the election of Henry St John was found to have bribed the voters himself, reportedly purchasing votes at one-and-a-half guineas a head, and his agent was taken into custody by order of the House of Commons. Again in 1700, bribery was reported to the committee and the agent was committed to Newgate Prison.

At the election of 1754, Robert Neale attempted to win the support of the Mayor (who was ex officio returning officer) with a bribe of £500, and both sides spent lavishly. The St John candidates (John Probyn and Thomas Estcourt Cresswell) paid 30 guineas a head to voters, the total cost including treating at taverns coming to £6000, while Neale admitted spending £1800 and his co-candidate the Earl of Drumlanrig probably spent a similar amount. St John's candidates were successful, but Neale petitioned against the outcome and (as a supporter of the government) apparently expected a partisan decision to overturn the result in his favour. In the event, the Duke of Newcastle, then serving as the prime minister, refused to support the petition but Neale was compensated £1000 from secret government funds.

After another contested election in election of 1784, when George Tierney, backed by the Hydes, spent £2500 in an unsuccessful attempt to win a seat against the St John candidates, the two families reached an agreement to nominate one MP each at future elections. This lasted until the early years of the following century when a barrister, James Kibblewhite, began to acquire property in the town and secured both a majority on the Corporation and sufficient "influence" with the voters to have his candidates returned as MPs – the nature of the influence is indicated by reports that the price of a vote had risen to 45 guineas a man. When Benjamin Walsh, who was elected on this occasion, was shortly afterwards declared bankrupt it emerged on the investigation of his accounts that he had paid £4000 for his seat. Kibblewhite sold his interest in the borough to Joseph Pitt for £22,000, but Pitt was unable to retain control over the voters despite his domination of the corporation and the St Johns and Hydes once more resumed the patronage.

Perhaps surprisingly, the corruption at Wootton Bassett never led to a major scandal or to any attempts to disfranchise the borough – unlike nearby Cricklade, which was "thrown into the hundred" for its misdemeanours in the 1770s, or Hindon which nearly suffered the same fate. However, the town was far too small to justify separate representation after the Great Reform Act, and the constituency was abolished in 1832. The town was within the penally-expanded boundaries of Cricklade, which retained both its MPs, and was thereafter part of that borough constituency.

Members of Parliament

1447–1640

1640–1832

Notes

References 
Robert Beatson, A Chronological Register of Both Houses of Parliament (London: Longman, Hurst, Res & Orme, 1807) 
D Brunton & D H Pennington, Members of the Long Parliament (London: George Allen & Unwin, 1954)
 John Cannon, Parliamentary Reform 1640–1832 (Cambridge: Cambridge University Press, 1972)
Cobbett's Parliamentary history of England, from the Norman Conquest in 1066 to the year 1803 (London: Thomas Hansard, 1808) 
 Lewis Namier & John Brooke, The History of Parliament: The House of Commons 1754–1790 (London: HMSO, 1964)
 T. H. B. Oldfield, The Representative History of Great Britain and Ireland (London: Baldwin, Cradock & Joy, 1816)
 J Holladay Philbin, Parliamentary Representation 1832 – England and Wales (New Haven: Yale University Press, 1965)
 Henry Stooks Smith, The Parliaments of England from 1715 to 1847 (2nd edition, edited by FWS Craig – Chichester: Parliamentary Reference Publications, 1973)
 Frederic A Youngs, jr, Guide to the Local Administrative Units of England, Vol I (London: Royal Historical Society, 1979)
 

Parliamentary constituencies in Wiltshire (historic)
Constituencies of the Parliament of the United Kingdom established in 1447
Constituencies of the Parliament of the United Kingdom disestablished in 1832
Rotten boroughs